Philippe Oddo (born 26 September 1959, in the 8th arrondissement of Paris), is a French financier, and a managing partner of the ODDO BHF group.

Biography
Oddo is the son of Bernard Oddo, a foreign exchange broker, and Colette Rathery. General Paul Oddo was his uncle.

He graduated from the HEC Paris in 1984. He also studied at the Paris Dauphine University, the New York University and the University of Cologne in Germany.

Oddo joined Oddo & Cie in 1984 and became a managing partner in 1987.

At the head of the Group, Philippe Oddo diversified the bank’s activities, particularly in the private banking and corporate banking sectors. Several acquisitions were carried out, such as the purchase of Delahaye Finance (1997), Pinatton, Crédit Lyonnais Securities Europe, Banque d’Orsay and Banque Robeco.

ODDO BHF is one of the banks that allocates the most resources to research and financial analysis relative to its income.

In 2017, Philippe Oddo and his family were ranked 101st in the French Fortune list by the magazine Challenges, with €800 million.

Other activities

Corporate boards
 Euronext, Member of Supervisory Board (2007-2015)

Non-profit organizations
 European School of Management and Technology (ESMT), Member of the International Advisory Council
 Bettencourt-Schueller Foundation, Member of the Board of Directors (since December 2011).
 Fondation pour la Recherche sur Alzheimer (IFRAD), Member of the Board of Directors
 Mouvement des entreprises de taille intermédiaire (METI), Vice-Chairman
 Le Siècle, Member

References

1959 births
Living people
French bankers
Businesspeople from Paris